The 2019 Japan Cup was a friendly women's handball tournament held in Shibuya Tokyo, Japan at the Yoyogi National Gymnasium between 21–24 November, organised by the Japan Handball Association as preparation for the home team for the 2019 World Women's Handball Championship and as a test event for the 2020 Summer Olympics.

Results

Round robin
All times are local (UTC+09:00).

Final standing

References

External links
Japan Handball Association Official Website

Japan Cup
Handball competitions in Japan
Japan Cup